The Battery E, 1st West Virginia Light Artillery Regiment was an artillery battery that served in the Union Army during the American Civil War.

Service
Battery E  was organized at Buckhannon in western Virginia on September 18, 1862 and absorbed Battery "B" West Virginia Light Artillery on December 31, 1864.   The Battery was known as the "Upshur Battery" due to the predominance of men from Upshur County who enlisted in its ranks.

Battery E was mustered out on June 28, 1865.

Casualties
The 1st West Virginia Light Artillery Regiment lost 33 men, killed and died of wounds; 131 men, died of disease, accident or in prison; total deaths, 164 men. (all 8 batteries)

[Source: Regimental Losses in the American Civil War, 1861–1865, by William F. Fox]

Commander
Captain Alexander C. Moore

References
The Civil War Archive
Unpublished manuscript "Joseph Rezin Thompson 'A Tankee Volunterr'"  Author Unknown

See also
West Virginia Units in the Civil War
West Virginia in the Civil War

Units and formations of the Union Army from West Virginia
Artillery units and formations of the American Civil War
1862 establishments in Virginia
Military units and formations established in 1862
Military units and formations disestablished in 1865